Lo Zappatore is a 1950 Italian melodrama film directed by Rate Furlan.

Cast
Clara Auteri Pepe
Angelo Dessy
Gabriele Ferzetti
Vera Furlan
Clelia Genovese
Nino Marchesini as Padre Di Carlo
Marisa Merlini
Nico Pepe
Enzo Romagnoli
Silvio Rossi
Tecla Scarano
Valeria Valeri
Vito Verde

External links
 
 Lo Zappatore at Variety Distribution

1950 films
1950s Italian-language films
Italian drama films
1950 drama films
Italian black-and-white films
Films directed by Rate Furlan
1950s Italian films